Pulihora, also known as puliyogare, puliyodarai, pulinchoru, kokum rice, or simply lemon or tamarind rice or Pavan Maruthi, is a very common and traditional rice preparation in the South Indian states of Telangana, Andhra Pradesh, Karnataka, Kerala and  Tamil Nadu.  means 'tangy' or 'sour' in South Indian languages, referring to the characterizing use of kokum or tamarind as one of the main ingredients.

Preparation
The pulihora is prepared with kokum, tamarind, lemon or green mango as main souring ingredient, along with a blend of spices, lentils, peanuts and jaggery cooked in oil and mixed with cooked rice along with fried curry leaves. It remains fresh for two days. So, many South Indian travelers carry the prepared tamarind rice on long journeys.

Pulihora gojju (paste) or Pulihora podi (powder) is often pre-made at homes in southern India and stored for months. It is mixed with cooked rice in a pan to make pulihora instantly.

Pulihora is usually cooked on special occasions and festive days. It is presented to God as part of prayers known as prasadam in most of the South Indian temples as well as South Indian homes. In temples, devotees queue to get it after .

See also
 Chitranna (lemon rice)

References

Indian rice dishes
South Indian cuisine
Telangana cuisine
Andhra cuisine
Tamil cuisine